Dellrose is an unincorporated community in Lincoln County, Tennessee, United States. It has a post office, with ZIP code 38453. It is located along Tennessee State Route 273 between Elkton and Fayetteville.

Demographics

History
Originally known as "Roosterville", Dellrose was first formed as a village in 1867, although a post office had been present in the area since 1849. By 1886, it was home to several churches as well as a school, blacksmith, and physician.

Notes

Unincorporated communities in Lincoln County, Tennessee
Unincorporated communities in Tennessee